Sir Thomas Bazley, 1st Baronet DL (27 May 1797 – 18 March 1885) was a British industrialist and Liberal politician.

Life
He was born at Gilnow, near Bolton, Lancashire. His father, also Thomas, was a cotton manufacturer, mathematician and journalist. Following education at Bolton Grammar School, Bazley was apprenticed to the cotton-spinning business of Messrs Ainsworth and Company. He subsequently went into business on his own account as a yarn merchant in Bolton. In 1826 he went into partnership with Robert Gardner, and they took over mills in Manchester and Halliwell. At Halliwell they established Barrow Bridge as a model non-sectarian industrial community. Bazley became the sole owner of Barrow Bridge in 1847, and the company became the world's largest manufacturer of fine cotton and lace thread. He was a major employer who also built schools and reading rooms for his employees.

In 1828 he married Mary Maria Sarah Nash, and they had one son, born in 1829.

From the 1830s Bazley was an active member of the Anti Corn Law League, and from 1845 to 1860 was president of the Manchester Chamber of Trade, and was appointed as Deputy Lieutenant of the County Palatine of Lancaster.

His expertise on the cotton industry led to his appointment as one of the commissioners of the Great Exhibition of 1851 and of the Paris International Exhibition of 1855. From 1853 to 1855 he was a member of the Royal Commission on assimilating the mercantile laws of the United Kingdom.

In 1858 he was elected unopposed as one of the members of parliament for the Parliamentary Borough of Manchester in the Liberal interest. He held the seat at subsequent elections until 1880. Due to the pressure of parliamentary work, he retired from business, selling his concern to William Romaine Callender in 1861. Callender was later to become one of Bazley's colleagues as MP for Manchester.

In the 1860s he acquired estates in Gloucestershire, Hertfordshire and Oxfordshire. In 1870 he moved permanently to his Gloucestershire estates near Fairford.

In 1867 he was admitted to the French Légion d'honneur. In 1869 he was created a baronet "of Hatherop in the County of Gloucester" for his services to public life and the cotton industry on the advice of the Prime Minister, William Ewart Gladstone.

Sir Thomas Bazley died suddenly at his summer residence "Riversleigh", Lytham, Lancashire in March 1885 aged 88. He was buried next to his father at St John's Church, Deansgate, Manchester.

Family
He married, on 2 June 1828, Mary Maria Sarah, daughter of Sebastian Nash of Clayton, near Manchester ; she died 22 August 1897, and left an only child, Sir Thomas Sebastian Bazley.

References

External links 
 
 

1797 births
1885 deaths
Liberal Party (UK) MPs for English constituencies
UK MPs 1857–1859
UK MPs 1859–1865
UK MPs 1865–1868
UK MPs 1868–1874
UK MPs 1874–1880
Deputy Lieutenants of Gloucestershire
Deputy Lieutenants of Lancashire
Members of the Parliament of the United Kingdom for Manchester
British textile industry businesspeople
Baronets in the Baronetage of the United Kingdom